Scandinavian Gold Cup is a sailing race held annually for 5.5 metre yachts. It is a nation race, meaning that each participant nation can send only one boat/team. Despite its name, it has been an international competition almost through its entire history, and participating is not limited to Scandinavian nations. The event has been held every year since 1919 (with exception of 1920 and 1940–46) making it one of the oldest active sailing trophies.

History 
The Cup was originally established by one of the oldest Finnish yacht clubs, Nyländska Jaktklubben (NJK) in 1919, to celebrate newly achieved Finnish independence, promote sailing and improve relations between Finnish and Swedish yacht racers. As such, it was a Cup for Scandinavian yachts only.  

At first, the Cup was a challenge competition between Finland and Sweden and it was raced with 40m² Skerry cruisers. The first event was won by Swedes. In 1922, the event was handed over to the Scandinavian Yacht Racing Union (SYRU), which created an international competition based on the now-popular International 6 Metre class. It was intended to replace older One Ton Cup as an international prize for smaller, more affordable racing yachts. 

1926 was the first year when competitors from outside the Nordic countries were allowed to enter and the Cup was soon established as one of the most coveted in the sailing world, attracting famous designers and competitors, including America's Cup winners.

By end of the 1930s, increasing costs began to decrease popularity of the 6mR class and it was gradually replaced by cheaper 5 Metre and 5.5 Metre classes. The Gold Cup was raced with 5.5 metre boats from 1953 onwards. It has continued to be raced annually, with the exception of 1986, when two competitions were held. The 2006 Cup was held in the Netherlands, involved 11 nations and was for the first time won by a Dutch team.

The Cup held its centennial edition in July 2019.

Editions

40m² Skerry cruiser

6 metre

5.5 metre

References

External links
 5.5 Metre class association
 TIME article from 1939 describing US boat Goose winning the trophy
 

40m² Skerry cruisers
5.5 Metre (keelboat)
6 Metre (keelboat)
Sailing competitions
Yachting races
Recurring sporting events established in 1919